Elections to Rugby Borough Council were held on 7 May 1998. One third of the council seats were up for election. The council stayed under no overall control. The number of councillors for each party after the election were Labour 22, Conservative 12, Liberal Democrat 5, Residents 5 and Independent 4.

Election result

|}

References

1998 English local elections
1998
20th century in Warwickshire